Sikorzyce may refer to the following places in Poland:
Sikorzyce, Lower Silesian Voivodeship (south-west Poland)
Sikorzyce, Lesser Poland Voivodeship (south Poland)
Sikorzyce, West Pomeranian Voivodeship (north-west Poland)